Mier might refer to one of the following:

Places
 Mier, Asturias, parish in northern Spain
 Ciudad Mier, city and municipality in northern Mexico
 Mier Expedition, from the Republic of Texas into Mexico, 1842-43
 Mier, Indiana, community in the U.S.
 Mier Local Municipality, in South Africa

People
 Francisco Mier y Torre, 18th-century governor of the New Kingdom of León
 Henry Mier, Uruguayan footballer
 Manuel Mier y Terán, 19th-century Mexican general
 Servando Teresa de Mier, 18th & 19th-century Catholic priest of New Spain
 Hiram Mier, Mexican footballer

Other
 Manchester Independent Economic Review (MIER)